Ivy Hill Cemetery is a historic rural cemetery and national historic district located at Smithfield, Isle of Wight County, Virginia. It was established in 1886, and is a privately owned cemetery.  Grave markers within the cemetery date from the mid-19th century to the present day.  It includes a number of notable funerary monuments.

Notable burials include:
 Pembroke Decatur Gwaltney (1836–1915), founder of the highly successful Gwaltney ham and peanut business
 Congressman Joel Holleman (1799–1844)
 Congressman Dr. John W. Lawson (1837–1905)
 Hardy Cross (1885–1959), Pioneer in the field of Structural Engineering

It was listed on the National Register of Historic Places in 2007.

References

External links

 

Cemeteries on the National Register of Historic Places in Virginia
Historic districts on the National Register of Historic Places in Virginia
National Register of Historic Places in Isle of Wight County, Virginia